Kittredge Haskins (April 8, 1836 – August 7, 1916) was a Vermont lawyer and politician who served in the U.S. House of Representatives.

Born in Dover, Vermont, Haskins attended the public schools and received instruction from a private tutor.

He studied law and was admitted to the bar in 1858. Commencing private practice in Wilmington, Vermont, he moved to Williamsville in 1861 and continued the practice of law.

During the American Civil War, Haskins enlisted as a private in Company I, 16th Vermont Infantry on August 23, 1862. He was commissioned first lieutenant on September 20 of that year and served until March 19, 1863, when he resigned on account of disabilities. Haskins returned to Vermont and settled in Brattleboro. He entered the government service as a civil employee in the office of the assistant quartermaster of Volunteers and served in that capacity until the close of the war.

After the end of the war Haskins resumed the practice of law. He was appointed a colonel and chief of staff to Governor Peter T. Washburn in 1869 and served as a member of the Republican state committee from 1869 to 1872.

Haskins served as a state's attorney from 1870 to 1872 and as a member of the Vermont House of Representatives from 1872 to 1874. Haskins served as U.S. Attorney for the District of Vermont from October 1880 to July 1887 and was a member of the Vermont Senate from 1892 to 1894. Haskins served as chairman of the Vermont Board of Commissioners to establish the boundary line between Vermont and Massachusetts from 1892 to 1900.

Haskins returned to the state House from 1896 to 1900, serving as speaker from 1898 to 1900.

Haskins was elected as a Republican to the 57th and to the three succeeding Congresses, serving from March 4, 1901 to March 3, 1909. He served as chairman of the Committee on War Claims during the 60th Congress. He was an unsuccessful candidate for renomination in 1908.

Haskins served as judge of the municipal court in Brattleboro in 1910 and as postmaster of Brattleboro from 1912 to 1915. He died in Brattleboro on August 7, 1916 and is interred in Prospect Hill Cemetery.

External links

1836 births
1916 deaths
People from Dover, Vermont
People of Vermont in the American Civil War
Republican Party members of the United States House of Representatives from Vermont
Speakers of the Vermont House of Representatives
Republican Party Vermont state senators
United States Attorneys for the District of Vermont
Union Army officers
People from Brattleboro, Vermont
19th-century American politicians
State's attorneys in Vermont